Kristina Guiourova (born 17 February 1959 in Sofia, Bulgaria) is a former individual Bulgarian rhythmic gymnast. She is the 1977 World All-around bronze medalist.

Career 
In 1977, Guiourova competed at the 1977 World Championships and won bronze medals in the all-around and hoop. She repeated her success at the 1979 World Championships in London include a gold in rope and silver in ribbon.

She left her native Bulgaria for Italy where she got married. She has a daughter Julieta Cantaluppi who is also Rhythmic gymnast but competes for Italy.

References

External links
 
 

1959 births
Living people
Gymnasts from Sofia
Bulgarian rhythmic gymnasts
Medalists at the Rhythmic Gymnastics World Championships
Bulgarian emigrants to Italy